Barry Welsh Is Coming is a sketch show produced by Absolutely Productions for HTV Wales. The programme was first broadcast at 10:40 pm on Friday 6 September 1996 and originally ran for 6 series with some episodes later broadcast on the Paramount Comedy Channel. It was produced by Pete Baikie, and almost all the main characters were played by John Sparkes, who also played the inept presenter Barry Welsh. For the final series, the show was renamed Barry Welsh Is Going and consisted of three compilation specials. The series was replaced by Jeff Global's Global Probe, which ended after six episodes.

The TV series also featured cast members from the Channel 4 series Absolutely, while some character elements from Absolutely were incorporated into the programme. Denzil and Gwynedd, two of the original Absolutely characters, briefly returned in Barry Welsh Is Coming for shorter sketches, now accompanied by their 21-year-old son, Codfyl.

The show returned in 2007 in the form of three themed specials broadcast throughout the year, presented by Sparkes in the guise of Fishguard news reporter Hugh Pugh. The new episodes were produced in-house by ITV Wales.

Characters

Hugh Pugh
The most popular segment of the programme, Hugh Pugh is a news reporter from Fishguard with a strong aversion towards Barry Welsh.

A.R.S.
The Animal Rescue Squad (or A.R.S. – pronounced as "arse"), is a lampoon of Animal Hospital and other animal welfare shows. The series is set in and around Cardiff, and features the short-tempered Dave Daley (Kim Wall), Dave Sinclair (John Sparkes), Dave Webster (Gordon Kennedy) at A.R.S. Control (his mothers' home), and an unnamed cameraman (Pete Baikie) who is always bullied by Dave Daley when Daley is in a fit of rage. The A.R.S. tend to rescue mostly insects such as spiders and wasps rather than larger animals, though dogs have appeared in later sketches. The sketches are narrated by Morwenna Banks.

Mr. Ffff
A dirty old man who explains about his sex life with elements of toilet humour from Frank Hovis. He frequently talks about masturbation and oral sex. He is often billed as "the oldest man in Wales". There was also a short sketch with Siadwel, previously performed on Naked Video.

Geraint Pillock
An edited 1970s news film featuring coracle enthusiast Denzil Davies, whose film has been doctored to appear as if "Geraint Pillock of Colwyn Bay" (as Barry Welsh names him) is trying bizarre feats in a coracle. The various challenges are attempted "mainly because it's a challenge, a challenge for me and a challenge for the coracle". The various challenges that Geraint attempts include crossing the Sahara Desert, travelling at 740 miles per hour, conquering the glaciers of the North Pole, circling the M25 for a year, and going to Mars. In the 2007 special Barry Welsh Has An Election, Geraint was elected as the Mayor of Fishguard.

Gwyn
An eccentric with a twitch (originally seen in Absolutely) based on Frank Hovis, but without the toilet humour. Elements of Hovis' karaoke to Stoneybridge were recycled when Gwyn sang live to the studio audience.

Aneurin Anus
A mock gardening show with strong gay sexual humour. Aneurin is a stereotypical Welsh gardener who was originally censored because of the strong content of anal jokes relating to homosexuality, but he is included in the VHS release of Barry Welsh: The Second Coming.

Kenny Twat
The former mayor of Fishguard. He was voted out in the 2007 Fishguard mayoral election (as seen in Barry Welsh Has An Election) after 70 years in office.

One-off specials
There have been a number of special one-off episodes, all of them with a particular theme.

Hugh Pugh Presents: The Fishguard Film Festival (27 March 2000)
A special programme from the fictitious Fishguard Film Festival. This episode won a BAFTA Cymru award for Best Light Entertainment.
St. David: Myth or Mister? (1 March 2001)
A St. David's Day special in which Barry Welsh searches for the truth behind the patron saint of Wales.
Barry Welsh Stays Up for St. David (28 February 2003)
Barry is joined by Gwyn, Mr. Ffff, Pete Baikie, and Beca Evans (Pub Quiz) for a "live" Hogmanay-style extravaganza as Wales counts down to midnight and the "Welshest day of the year", St. David's Day.
The History of Wales according to Hugh Pugh (1 March 2004)
The third St. David's Day special from the series, in which Hugh Pugh provides his own personal account of ten thousand years of Welsh history. This episode won the 2005 BAFTA Cymru award for Best Light Entertainment.
Barry Welsh Has An Election (3 May 2007)
As part of ITV Wales's Welsh Assembly election coverage, Hugh Pugh presents coverage of the Fishguard mayoral election, in which Mayor of Fishguard Mr. Kenny Twat stood for election against rival candidates Barry Welsh and Geraint Pillock.
Hugh Pugh Kicks Off (6 September 2007)
The manic Fishguard reporter focuses on the build-up to the 2007 Rugby World Cup.
Hugh Pugh's Christmas Cracker (19 December 2007)
A special Christmas episode looking back at the highlights from ten years of spoof news bulletins and reports from Fishguard reporter, Hugh Pugh.

External links
Archive website

References

ITV sketch shows
ITV comedy
Welsh television shows
1990s Welsh television series
2000s Welsh television series
1996 British television series debuts
2004 British television series endings
Television series by ITV Studios
English-language television shows
Television shows produced by Harlech Television (HTV)
1990s British television sketch shows
2000s British television sketch shows